Lindera praecox, the February spicebush, is a species of flowering plant in the family Lauraceae, native to southern China, and Japan. In the wild it is found in thickets on the slopes of hills and mountains, and on the banks of streams and lakes. It is occasionally available from specialty nurseries.

References

praecox
Flora of South-Central China
Flora of Southeast China
Flora of Japan
Plants described in 1851